Percy Borucki (born 22 July 1929) is a German fencer. He represented the United Team of Germany at the 1964 Summer Olympics and West Germany at the 1968 Summer Olympics in the team sabre events.

References

External links

1929 births
Possibly living people
German male fencers
German people of Polish descent
Olympic fencers of the United Team of Germany
Olympic fencers of West Germany
Fencers at the 1964 Summer Olympics
Fencers at the 1968 Summer Olympics
Sportspeople from Katowice
20th-century German people